Raja Inal Siregar (5 March 1938 – 5 September 2005) was governor of North Sumatra from 1988 to 1998. He was among the Mandala Airlines Flight 091 crash victims, succumbing to his injuries a day after the crash. He was said to be on his way to talks with then-Indonesian President Susilo Bambang Yudhoyono at the time.

Web sources 

1938 births
2005 deaths
Governors of North Sumatra
Victims of aviation accidents or incidents in Indonesia
People from Medan
People of Batak descent
Victims of aviation accidents or incidents in 2005